Entail Act (with its variations) is a stock short title used in the United Kingdom for legislation relating to entails.

List
The Entail (Scotland) Act 1914 (4 & 5 Geo 5 c 43)

The Entail Acts is the collective title of the following Acts:
The Entail Act 1685 (c 26) [12mo ed: c 22]
The Tenures Abolition Act 1746 (20 Geo 2 c 50 ss 14, 15, 16, 17)
The Sales to Crown Act 1746 (20 Geo 2 c 51 ss 2, 3)
The Entail Improvement Act 1770 (10 Geo 3 c 51)
The Entail Provisions Act 1824 (5 Geo 4 c 87)
The Entail Powers Act 1836 (6 & 7 Will 4 c 42)
The Entail Sites Act 1840 (3 & 4 Vict c 48)
The Entail Amendment Act 1848 (11 & 12 Vict c 36)
The Entail Amendment Act 1853 (16 & 17 Vict c 94)
The Entail Cottages Act 1860 (23 & 24 Vict c 95)
The Entail Amendment Act 1868 (31 & 32 Vict c 84)
The Entail Amendment Act 1875 (38 & 39 Vict c 61)
The Entail Amendment Act 1878 (41 & 42 Vict c 28)
The Roads and Bridges (Scotland) Act 1878 (41 & 42 Vict c 51 s 70)
The Roads Amendment Act 1880 (43 Vict c 7)
The Entail (Scotland) Act 1882 (45 & 46 Vict c 53)

See also
List of short titles

References

Lists of legislation by short title and collective title